The 2019 World Snooker Championship (officially the 2019 Betfred World Snooker Championship) was a professional snooker tournament that took place from 20 April to 6 May 2019 at the Crucible Theatre in Sheffield, England. It was the 43rd consecutive year the World Snooker Championship had been held at the Crucible, and the 20th and final ranking event of the 2018–19 snooker season. Qualifying for the tournament took place from 10 to 17 April 2019 at the English Institute of Sport in Sheffield. Sports betting company Betfred sponsored the event.

The winner of the title was Judd Trump, who defeated John Higgins 18–9 in the final to claim his first World Championship. In doing so, Trump became the 11th player to win all three Triple Crown titles at least once. Defending champion Mark Williams lost 9–13 to David Gilbert in the second round of the tournament. For the first time in the history of the World Snooker Championship, an amateur player appeared at the main stage of the event—debutant James Cahill defeated world number one Ronnie O'Sullivan in the first round, before being narrowly defeated by Stephen Maguire in a second round deciding .

The tournament featured 100 century breaks; at the time, this was the highest number recorded at an official snooker event (superseded at the 2021 World Championship). The final match alone included 11 centuries, the most ever scored in the final of a ranking event. Higgins compiled the highest break, a 143, in his semi-final win over Gilbert. Shaun Murphy defeated Luo Honghao in the first round 10–0, the first whitewash at the World Championship since 1992.

Background 

The World Snooker Championship is an annual cue sport tournament and the official world championship of the game of snooker. Founded in the late 19th century by British Army soldiers stationed in India, the sport was popular in the British Isles. However, in the modern era it has become increasingly popular worldwide, especially in East and Southeast Asian nations such as China, Hong Kong and Thailand.

The championship features 32 professional and qualified amateur players competing in one-on-one snooker matches in a single elimination format, each played over several . The 32 competitors in the main tournament are selected using a combination of the top players in the world snooker rankings and a pre-tournament qualification stage. Joe Davis won the first World Championship in 1927, the final match being held in Camkin's Hall, Birmingham, England. Since 1977, the event has been held in the Crucible Theatre in Sheffield, England.

, Stephen Hendry and  Ronnie O’Sullivan are the event's most successful participants in the modern era, having both won the championship seven times. The 2018 World Championship had been won by Welsh professional player Mark Williams, who defeated Scotland's John Higgins 18–16 in the final. This was Williams' third world title, having won the championship in 2000 and 2003. The winner of the 2019 tournament earned prize money of £500,000, from a total pool of £2,231,000. The title sponsor of the event was sports betting company Betfred, who had sponsored the World Snooker Championship every year since 2015 (having previously sponsored the event from 2009 to 2012).

Format 

The 2019 World Snooker Championship took place between 20 April and 6May 2019 in Sheffield, England. The tournament was the last of twenty ranking events in the 2018/2019 season on the World Snooker Tour. It featured a 32-player main draw that was held at the Crucible Theatre, as well as a 128-player qualifying draw that was played at the English Institute of Sport from 10 to 17 April 2019, finishing three days before the start of the main draw. This was the 43rd consecutive year the tournament was held at the Crucible, and the 51st consecutive year the championship was contested using the modern knockout format.

The top 16 players in the latest world rankings automatically qualified for the main draw as seeded players. Defending champion Mark Williams was automatically seeded first overall. The remaining 15 seeds were allocated based on the latest world rankings, which were released after the China Open, the penultimate event of the season. Matches in the first round of the main draw were played as the best of 19 frames. The number of frames required to win a match increased progressively with each successive round, leading up to the final match which was played as the best of 35 frames.

All 16 non-seeded spots in the main draw were filled with players who had advanced through the qualifying rounds. There were 128 players in the qualifying draw, which comprised 106 of the remaining 112 players on the World Snooker Tour, as well as 22 wildcard places allotted to non-tour players. These invited players included the women's world champion, the European junior champion, and the four semi-finalists at the amateur championship. As with the main draw, half of the participants in the qualifying draw were seeded players; those ranked from 17th to 80th in the world rankings were allocated one of 64 seeds in order of their ranking, while the other competitors were placed randomly into the draw. To reach the main draw at the Crucible, players needed to win three best-of-19-frames qualifying matches.

Participant summary 

Eight former world champions participated in the main tournament at the Crucible. They were Ronnie O'Sullivan (five titles: 2001, 2004, 2008, 2012, 2013), John Higgins (four titles: 1998, 2007, 2009, 2011), Mark Williams (defending champion, three titles: 2001, 2003, 2018), Mark Selby (three titles: 2014, 2016, 2017), Shaun Murphy (one title: 2005), Graeme Dott (one title: 2006), Neil Robertson (one title: 2010), and Stuart Bingham (one title: 2015). This was O'Sullivan's 27th consecutive appearance in the final stages of the World Championship since his debut in 1993, equalling Stephen Hendry's record for consecutive appearances, and three short of Steve Davis's overall record of 30 appearances. Four other former World Championship finalists also competed: Ali Carter (twice: 2008 and 2012), Judd Trump (once: 2011), Barry Hawkins (once: 2013), and Ding Junhui (once: 2016). The youngest player to participate in the main stage of the tournament was Luo Honghao at 19 years of age, while 46-year-old Mark Davis was the oldest; both players entered the main draw through qualifying.

Three former world champions participated in the qualifying rounds: Ken Doherty (1997), Peter Ebdon (2002) and Graeme Dott (2006). Of these, only Dott succeeded in qualifying for the main tournament at the Crucible. Also, four former World Championship finalists participated in the qualifying rounds: Jimmy White (six times: 1984 and 1990–1994), Nigel Bond (once: 1995), Matthew Stevens (twice: 2000 and 2005), and Ali Carter (twice: 2008 and 2012). Of these, only Carter qualified for the main tournament at the Crucible.

Prize fund 

The total purse for the event was greater than for any prior snooker tournament. For the first time the total prize pool was over £2 million, with the winner being awarded £500,000. The breakdown of prize money was:

 Winner: £500,000
 Runner-up: £200,000
 Semi-final: £100,000
 Quarter-final: £50,000
 Last 16: £30,000
 Last 32: £20,000
 Last 48: £15,000
 Last 80: £10,000
 Main stage highest break: £10,000
 Qualifying stage highest break: £1,000
 Total: £2,231,000

The prize for a maximum break in the main stage was £50,000.

Tournament summary

Qualifying rounds 

The top 16 seeds automatically qualified for the competition's main draw. The defending champion Mark Williams was seeded first, whilst other seeds were allocated based on the world rankings following the China Open. The remaining players competed in the preliminary qualifying rounds, and were required to win three best-of-19-frames matches to reach the main stage of the championship.

The qualifying rounds took place at the English Institute of Sport in Sheffield between 10 and 17 April 2019, with 16 players progressing to the main stage at the Crucible Theatre. A total of 128 players competed in the qualifying stage, including those tour players not automatically qualified for the main draw, as well as invited amateurs.

James Cahill became the first amateur player ever to qualify for the Crucible main stage of the World Championship, defeating fellow amateur Michael Judge 10–6 in the third qualifying round. Seven players—the largest number since 1999—advanced through the qualifying rounds to make their debuts at the main stage of the tournament. Besides Cahill, they were Scott Donaldson, Michael Georgiou (The first ever Cypriot to play at the crucible), Li Hang, Luo Honghao, Tian Pengfei and Zhao Xintong. The 2006 World Champion Graeme Dott and two-time finalist Ali Carter also qualified. Marco Fu failed to reach the main draw of the competition for the first time since 2004.

First round

The draw for the first round of the championship was made on 18 April 2019, the day after the conclusion of the qualifying rounds and two days before the start of the main event. The matches were drawn by World Snooker chairman Barry Hearn and 1991 World Champion John Parrott. The first round of the championship took place between 20 and 25 April 2019. All first round matches were played over two sessions as best-of-19 frames.

Top half 

The tournament began with defending champion Mark Williams (seeded one) drawing qualifier Martin Gould. Both sessions of this first match were played on the opening day of the event. Gould won the first frame with a break of 64, before Williams took the next five with breaks of 55, 54 and 129, to lead 5–1. Gould won frames seven and eight, but Williams took the session's final frame with a break of 97 to lead 6–3. However, Williams potted the black to go ahead 7–3. Gould then won frame 11, but Williams claimed the next two frames to open up a five-frame lead, at 9–4. Despite Gould responding with breaks of 70, 87 and 76, to reduce his deficit to 7–9, Williams clinched the 17th frame to win the match 10–7. After his victory, Williams complained that World Snooker had not allowed his 12-year-old son backstage before the match, which the governing body denied.

Event debutant Luo Honghao was drawn against 13th seed Shaun Murphy. Finishing 10–0 to Murphy, the match was a whitewash, only the second ever to be witnessed at the Crucible (the first being John Parrott's defeat of Eddie Charlton in the first round of the 1992 championship). Luo accumulated just 89 points during the entire match, the lowest number of points ever scored in a World Championship match, and more than 100 fewer than the previous record low of 191 scored by Danny Fowler when he lost 1–10 to Stephen Hendry in the 1993 championship. Fourth seed Neil Robertson met qualifier, Michael Georgiou, in the first round. At the conclusion of the initial session, Georgiou was 0–9 behind, having scored even fewer points than Luo in the first nine frames of the match. However, he won frame ten on the resumption of play in the second session, with a break of 90, thus avoiding both the whitewash and the lowest points total. Robertson later won the match 10–1 to progress to the second round.

Fifth seed John Higgins played qualifier Mark Davis, who had won six of the pair's last seven encounters. Higgins took a 6–3 lead after the first session, but then spent the night in Royal Hallamshire Hospital because his brother Jason had fallen down some stairs at the venue and fractured his kneecap. Higgins won the match 10–7 the following day.

Two former world champions, 12th seed Stuart Bingham (2015 winner) and qualifier Graeme Dott (2006 winner), met in the first round of the competition. Bingham led 8–1 after the first session, and later 9–4, before Dott won five frames to level the match at 9–9. After the match, Dott explained that "serious sleeping problems" had caused him difficulties while playing.

Bottom half 

The first round match between 14th seed Luca Brecel and qualifier Gary Wilson, which featured a large amount of tactical play, was suspended when the afternoon session overran, with Wilson leading 9–8. On resuming that evening, Brecel won frame 18 to send the match to a deciding frame. After first requiring a re-rack, this frame lasted for 79 minutes and 31 seconds, setting the record for the longest frame ever played at the Crucible (breaking the previous record set in 2016 by Mark Selby and Marco Fu by more than three minutes) which Wilson won. Tenth seed Ding Junhui played qualifier Anthony McGill. After leading 6–3 overnight, Ding won the match 10–7 to progress to the second round.

Having lost eight of his previous 15 first round matches at the Crucible, 15th seed Stephen Maguire played event debutant Tian Pengfei. Maguire later described this fluke as "just outrageous" and admitted he "got lucky". He added  and black to steal the frame, and then took the next two frames to win the match 10–9. Three-time former world champion and third seed, Mark Selby, played debutant Zhao Xintong. Despite trailing 1–5 after the first six frames, Selby won nine of the next eleven frames, with two breaks of 131, to win 10–7.

Amateur player James Cahill drew the world number one Ronnie O'Sullivan, who had reached the finals of the other Triple Crown events earlier in the season. Cahill finished the first session with a 5–4 lead, and then went ahead 8–5 in the second session before O'Sullivan levelled the match at 8–8. Cahill missed a straightforward shot on a  after compiling an early break in frame 17; however, despite needing only the final pink and black to win, O'Sullivan missed the pink, allowing Cahill to clinch the frame. With a break of 56 in the next frame, Cahill won the match 10–8 to secure a place in the second round. This was Cahill's second win over the top-ranked player in the season, having defeated Mark Selby in the first round of the UK Championship five months earlier. Afterwards, O'Sullivan indicated that he had been unwell during the match, but former world champion Ken Doherty accused him of "playing too casually".

Second round 

The last 16 players in the competition took part in the second round, which was played between 25 and 29 April, with matches completed over three sessions as best of 25 frames. Fourth seed Neil Robertson played 13th seed Shaun Murphy. The first session of the match featured a maximum break attempt by Murphy; with just two red balls remaining, he asked for the screen between the tables to be lifted, allowing the spectators in the other half of the auditorium to watch his attempt at a maximum, but he failed to finish it. Prior to this dramatic turn of events, Robertson had won the first three frames of the match, without Murphy attempting a pot. Robertson led 5–3 after the first session and 10–6 after the second. He later won the first three frames of the final session to win the match 13–6. Post-match, Murphy called Robertson "just too good" and "unplayable".

Defending champion Mark Williams played 16th seed David Gilbert. After the first session, with Gilbert leading 5–3, Williams said he had been feeling chest pains during play. He was taken to Northern General Hospital overnight but returned the following morning for the second session of the match. He later tied the match 7–7, but was trailing again 7–9 after the second session. Gilbert then won the first four frames of the final session to win the match 13–9.

Amateur player James Cahill drew 15th seed Stephen Maguire. After the first two sessions, Maguire was ahead 5–3 and 9–7, but Cahill then took three of the first four frames in the third session to level the match at 10–10. He also won frame 21, to take the lead for the first time in the match, but Maguire drew level in the following frame. Maguire won the decider, and the match, 13–12.

Three-time world champion Mark Selby played qualifier Gary Wilson. Despite trailing 3–5 after the first session, Selby won four of the first five frames in the second session to lead 7–6; however, Wilson took the last three frames of the session to lead 9–7. Selby later tied the match at 10–10, before Wilson won three consecutive frames to secure a place in the quarter-finals. Two former world champions, fifth seed John Higgins and 12th seed Stuart Bingham, met in the second round. Bingham took an early 4–1 lead, but Higgins won the remaining frames of the first session, with a 132 break in the eighth, to level at 4–4. The second session was even, with no more than two frames separating the players, and the match was tied again at 8–8 and 11–11. Bingham described the close-fought encounter as a "good battle" and Higgins admitted he was "over the moon" to have won.

Ninth seed and 2013 runner-up, Barry Hawkins, played eighth seed Kyren Wilson. This match included nine century breaks, setting a new record for the second round of the championships. Hawkins made four century breaks of 105, 130, 136, and 137 during the first session, including a maximum break attempt; Wilson also compiled a century in frame five. With four frames in a row ending with a 100+ break, this was the first time since the 1999 semi-final between Ronnie O'Sullivan and Stephen Hendry that four centuries had been compiled in consecutive frames in a World Championship match. After winning the first four frames of the match, Hawkins ended the first session with a 6–2 lead. Wilson won the second session of the match 5–3, to trail 7–9, before twice drawing level at 9–9 and 10–10 in the final session. Despite Hawkins pulling ahead, at 10–9 and 11–10, Wilson won the last three frames of the match to progress to the next round, 13–11.

Zhou Yuelong played Ali Carter in the only all-qualifier encounter of the second round. Zhou took four of the first five frames to lead 4–1, then led 5–3 after the first session, and held the lead at 9–7 after the second. On resuming the match in the final session, Carter won six straight frames to progress 13–9. Two former world finalists, Judd Trump and Ding Junhui, met in the second round. Trump took an early 5–1 lead in the first session, but Ding won eight of the next ten frames to lead 9–7 before the final session. Trump then took six frames in a row, including breaks of 93, 79, 54 and 103, to win the match 13–9.

Quarter-finals 

The quarter-finals took place on 30 April and 1May, and like the previous round, matches were played as best of 25 frames across three sessions. Ali Carter played Gary Wilson in an all-qualifier match. Despite this being his first World Championship quarter-final, and after losing the first three frames of the match, Wilson won five straight frames to lead 5–3 after the first session. The pair shared the second session, with both players winning four frames, bringing the score to 9–7 ahead of the final session. Carter won two of the next three frames, including a break of 128, to trail 9–10, before Wilson won the next three to progress 13–9. Post-match, Carter said, "You have to take your hat off to [Wilson]. I did not think he could play that good," noting that despite Wilson's low ranking of 32 "[he] has to be the favourite to win it now, the way he has been playing."

The 2019 Masters champion, Judd Trump, played 15th seed Stephen Maguire. Having won six straight frames to conclude his second-round match against Ding Junhui, Trump won another six consecutive frames at the start of this match, scoring breaks of 131, 67, 106, 78 and 101, to lead 7–1 after the first session. He looked set to win the match in the second session without needing to play the third, extending his lead to 9–1. However, Maguire won four of the remaining frames, to trail 5–11 by the end of the session. Trump won the match 13–6, after just three frames of the final session. Maguire was fined £250 for swearing in a post-match press conference when he was asked to summarise his performance in the match.

Eighth seed Kyren Wilson played 16th seed David Gilbert. The pair had met earlier in the season, in the final of the 2019 German Masters, where Wilson had won the tournament 9–7. The two players shared the opening session of their quarter-final, 4–4; Gilbert then won six of the eight frames in the second session to lead 10–6 overnight. Wilson won two of the first three frames of the final session to trail 8–11, but Gilbert took the next two frames to win the match 13–8.

Four-time world champion John Higgins played fourth seed Neil Robertson in the last of the quarter-finals. Robertson took an early 3–1 lead, but Higgins tied the match at 4–4. Robertson pulled away to 7–4 at the start of the second session, before Higgins won five frames in a row to take a 9–7 lead. After sharing the first six frames of the final session, Higgins won the match 13–10, with a century break of 101 in the next frame, to progress to the semi-finals.

Semi-finals 

The two semi-finals were played from 2to 5May, with the matches spread over four sessions as best of 33 frames. The first semi-final pitted four-time champion John Higgins against David Gilbert, who had never previously progressed past the second round of the championships. Higgins won the first two frames, but Gilbert tied the match at 2–2, with the help of a 94 break.

Gilbert won the first three frames of the second session, including a 125 break, to increase his lead to 8–3. Higgins also won the next two frames, compiling breaks of 67, 52 and 58, to trail 6–8; however, Gilbert took the final two frames of the session to lead 10–6. Pundit John Virgo reflected that Higgins was "not with it", whilst six-time champion Steve Davis called Higgins' performance "ridiculous".

When the match resumed for the third session, a crowd member was ejected from the auditorium for shouting out immediately after the  shot in the initial frame; Gilbert took the frame, increasing his lead to 11–6. Higgins won two of the next three frames to stay four behind at 8–12. He then compiled a 143 break, the highest of the tournament, in frame 21; this was also the 86th century break of the championship so far, tying the record for the number of centuries in a World Snooker Championship, set in 2015. Gilbert won the next frame, falling short of a century, with a break of 91. Higgins then won the final two frames of the session to reduce his deficit to 11–13.

Gilbert took the initial frame of the fourth (and final) session, but Higgins, having not led the match since mid-way through the first session, won the next four frames to go ahead 15–14. Gilbert then restored his lead by winning the next two frames, before Higgins scored a 139 break to level the score at 16–16, forcing a decider. Higgins won the final frame and the match after Gilbert missed the black ball from the spot. Both players gave emotional press conferences afterward, with Gilbert commenting, "I have never won anything, I have come close but this is the best couple of weeks I have had in my snooker career by a mile. It might be the closest I will come to winning the World Championship." Higgins apologized for his poor play during the match, and for bringing Gilbert "down to [his] level" in the first three sessions.

Judd Trump faced qualifier, Gary Wilson, in the second semi-final. They shared the opening session, 4–4, but Wilson later took a 6–5 lead with a break of 65. Trump won the next three frames with breaks of 73, 123 and 75, to lead 9–6, before Wilson compiled a 77 break, bringing the score to 9–7 after the first two sessions. Wilson won frame 17 with a break of 50; however, Trump took the next three frames, including a break of 114, which was the 87th century of the tournament (overtaking the previous all-time record of centuries compiled at any World Snooker Championship). Trump was 14–10 ahead at the end of the third session.

Wilson won the first frame of the final session, but Trump claimed the next three to win the match 17–11. Afterwards, Trump suggested that neither he nor Higgins had played particularly well in their respective semi-final matches, despite their both reaching the final. Wilson, ranked 30 in the world, said Judd deserved to win, but he commented on the poor playing conditions, saying: "I wasn't good enough... but I've got to say that table is disgusting. It's running off all over the place, you're getting square bounces, kicks every other shot."

Final 

The final was played over four sessions on 5and 6May, as a best-of-35-frames match. It was a repeat of the 2011 World Championship final between John Higgins and Judd Trump, when Higgins won the match 18–15 to claim his fourth world title. To reach the 2019 final, Higgins had defeated Mark Davis, Stuart Bingham, Neil Robertson and David Gilbert, while Trump had defeated Thepchaiya Un-Nooh, Ding Junhui, Stephen Maguire and Gary Wilson. This was Higgins' third consecutive World Championship final (having been defeated by Mark Selby in 2017 and Mark Williams in 2018), and his eighth overall. Higgins had previously won the World Snooker Championship four times (in 1998, 2007, 2009 and 2011). This was Trump's second world final, his first being the 2011 loss to Higgins.

Trump won the first two frames of the opening session, with breaks of 51 and 63. Higgins replied with a break of 139 to trail 1–2, before Trump scored a century of his own, a 105, to take a two-frame lead at the first mid-session interval. Breaks of 69, 34, 40 and 101 allowed Higgins to accumulate 244 unanswered points, claiming three consecutive frames to lead 4–3. Trump then tied the match at 4–4 by compiling the fourth century of the session.

At the beginning of the nine-frame evening session, Higgins compiled a break of 125, the third consecutive century of the match, to move ahead 5–4. Trump won the remaining eight frames of the session, including breaks of 135 and 114, to lead by seven frames overnight, 12–5. Steve Davis commented on the session: "I've seen some astonishing snooker here, a lot of it from Ronnie O'Sullivan, but that was a different type of astonishing. I am a little bit in shock. He is making a lot of very difficult shots seem very easy."

The third session opened with an attempt at a maximum break from Higgins, who potted 14 reds and 14 blacks before running out of position for the final red; he played a full-table double to pot the red ball, but then missed the following black. He also won frame 19, to trail 7–12, but Trump took the next three to extend his lead to 15–7. Higgins won the next two frames, which prevented the match from concluding with a session to spare. Trump attempted a maximum break of his own in frame 25, but he  a red into the middle pocket. Going into the evening session with a 16–9 lead, Trump won two straight frames to win the match 18–9 and claim the 2019 world title. This was the largest margin of victory in a World Championship final since 2009, when Higgins defeated Shaun Murphy by the same scoreline.

With eleven centuries between the two players, the final set the record for the most 100+ breaks in a single match, one more than the previous record held by Alan McManus and Ding Junhui in the semi-final of the 2016 World Championship. After the final, Higgins praised Trump's performance saying, "I was the lucky one to not have to pay for a ticket, he was just awesome." BBC pundit Steve Davis commented, "The standard in that final may have been the greatest we have ever seen and Judd Trump was at the heart of it." This was Trump's second Triple Crown title of the season after winning the Masters in January.

Main draw 

Numbers given in brackets after players' names show the seedings for the top 16 players in the competition. The sole amateur player in the championship is indicated with (a).

Qualifying 

Qualifying for the 2019 World Snooker Championship took place from 10 to 17 April 2019 at the English Institute of Sport in Sheffield, using a 12-table set-up. Starting with a pool of 128 players, the qualifying competition consisted of three knock-out rounds, with all matches played over two sessions as best of 19 frames. The 16 winners of the third round matches progressed to the main stages of the tournament at the Crucible Theatre.

The tour players (ranked outside the top-16) were joined by wildcard amateur players who achieved success through the WPBSA qualifying criteria:
 2018–19 Challenge Tour—top four ranked players: Brandon Sargeant, David Grace, Mitchell Mann, David Lilley
 EBSA European U-21 / U-18 Championship 2019 semi-finalists: Jackson Page, Aaron Hill, Ross Bulman, Dylan Emery, Florian Nüßle
 World Women's Snooker Tour—top two ranked players: Ng On-yee, Reanne Evans
 World Seniors Snooker Tour—top ranked player: Johnathan Bagley
 African champion: Mostafa Dorgham
 Americas champion: Igor Figueiredo
 Oceania champion: Adam Lilley
 CBSA nomination: Pang Junxu
 Decided by WPBSA: Farakh Ajaib, James Cahill, Adam Duffy, Andy Hicks, Luke Simmonds, Michael Judge

Players ranked 17 to 80 in the 2018/2019 world rankings were seeded 1to 64 in qualifying. The remaining tour players plus the invited amateurs were drawn randomly.

Round 1
There were 64 matches in the first round of qualifying. Each match was played between a seeded and a non-seeded player. Numbers given in brackets after players' names (in left-hand columns below) show the seedings (1 to 64) for the players ranked 17 to 80 in the 2018/2019 world rankings.

Round 2

Round 3
Winners of the third round qualifying matches advanced to the main draw.

Century breaks

Main stage centuries 

The main stage of the 2019 World Snooker Championship yielded 100 centuries, made by 23 players. The highest break of the tournament, a 143, was compiled by John Higgins in his semi-final match with David Gilbert.

The championship broke a number of records in terms of century breaks, including the total number compiled in the main stage of a snooker tournament: there were 14 more centuries than the 86 recorded in both the 2015 and the 2016 championships. The final featured 11 century breaks, the highest number ever compiled in a single match, one more than the ten centuries in the 2016 semi-final between Ding Junhui and Allan McManus. Judd Trump equalled Ding's record of seven centuries made by one player in a world championship match.

 143, 139, 139, 135, 132, 132, 130, 125, 113, 101, 101, 100  John Higgins
 141, 135, 131, 126, 123, 114, 114, 106, 105, 104, 103, 103, 101, 101  Judd Trump
 140, 134, 134, 117, 115, 109, 106, 100  Gary Wilson
 139, 125, 113, 109, 105, 102, 100  David Gilbert
 138, 132, 131, 125, 111, 104, 100  Kyren Wilson
 138, 123, 112, 109, 102, 101  Shaun Murphy
 137, 136, 130, 105  Barry Hawkins
 136  Joe Perry
 135, 128, 102  Ali Carter
 134, 129, 106  Ding Junhui
 131, 131, 120, 102  Mark Selby
 131, 125, 122, 121, 110, 105, 103  Stephen Maguire
 131  Mark Allen
 131  Luca Brecel
 129, 105, 101  Mark Williams
 127, 120, 120, 114, 106, 100  Neil Robertson
 124, 101  Jack Lisowski
 114  Graeme Dott
 112, 107, 106  Stuart Bingham
 106, 105, 101  Zhou Yuelong
 104, 100  Tian Pengfei
 104  Ronnie O'Sullivan
 101  James Cahill

Qualifying stage centuries 

A total of 122 century breaks were made by 57 players during the qualifying stage of the World Championship.

 146, 121, 118, 113  Noppon Saengkham
 143, 143, 116, 114, 111  Matthew Stevens
 141, 133, 122, 119, 114  Liang Wenbo
 140, 135, 103  Graeme Dott
 139, 109, 107  Chris Wakelin
 138, 128  Marco Fu
 138, 124, 122, 102, 100  Joe O'Connor
 138, 107  Thepchaiya Un-Nooh
 136, 136, 115, 106  Zhou Yuelong
 136, 113, 107, 100, 100  Daniel Wells
 136, 106  Michael Holt
 136  Elliot Slessor
 135, 113  Lu Ning
 135, 100  Lyu Haotian
 134, 112, 100  Gary Wilson
 133, 125  Tian Pengfei
 133, 119, 105  Xiao Guodong
 132, 102, 100  Martin Gould
 132  Eden Sharav
 131, 119, 118, 113, 103, 100  James Cahill
 131, 118, 116  Anthony McGill
 130, 102  Scott Donaldson
 130  Andy Hicks
 130  Alan McManus
 128, 103  Yan Bingtao
 128  Hossein Vafaei
 127, 120, 102, 101  Ali Carter
 127, 110, 102, 100  Joe Perry
 127, 106  Sam Craigie
 124, 103  Zhao Xintong
 122, 109, 102  Mark Davis
 121, 117, 101  Michael Georgiou
 121  Kurt Maflin
 121  Alexander Ursenbacher
 120  Johnathan Bagley
 119, 100  Stuart Carrington
 118  Gerard Greene
 117  Ashley Carty
 116  Brandon Sargeant
 116  Soheil Vahedi
 116  Xu Si
 114, 100  Ben Woollaston
 114  Robbie Williams
 112  Zhang Anda
 111, 108  John Astley
 111  Li Hang
 109  Niu Zhuang
 108, 102  Ian Burns
 106, 101  Tom Ford
 106  Sam Baird
 106  Luo Honghao
 105, 101  Mei Xiwen
 103  Lukas Kleckers
 102  David Lilley
 101  Martin O'Donnell
 101  Sunny Akani
 100  Dominic Dale

Coverage 

The 2019 World Snooker Championship was broadcast live in the United Kingdom by BBC Television and BBC Online, as well as on Eurosport. Internationally, the event was broadcast by DAZN in Canada and the United States, by SKY in New Zealand, and by Now TV in Hong Kong.

World Snooker live streamed the event internationally on Facebook, doing so for the second time. Coverage of the qualifying rounds was also live streamed on Facebook, Eurosport Player and selected betting sites.

In Scotland, the BBC was criticised for showing the World Championship on BBC Scotland, rather than a speech by Scotland's first minister Nicola Sturgeon on Scottish independence. The BBC defended the decision, explaining that the speech had been broadcast live on its BBC Scotland news website.

Notes

References 

2019
World Championship
2019 in English sport
April 2019 sports events in the United Kingdom
May 2019 sports events in the United Kingdom
Sports competitions in Sheffield